Ludovico D'Orazio (born 19 February 2000) is an Italian football player. He plays for  club Mantova on loan from SPAL.

Club career
He is a product of Roma youth teams and started playing for their Under-19 squad in the 2017–18 season.

He made his first appearance for Roma's senior squad on 6 September 2018 in a friendly against Benevento.

He made his professional Serie C debut for Feralpisalò on 27 September 2020 in a game against Arezzo.

On 30 July 2021, he signed a three-year contract with Serie B club SPAL. He made his Serie B debut for SPAL on 22 August 2021 against Pisa.

On 19 August 2022, D'Orazio returned to Feralpisalò on loan. On 30 January 2023, he moved on a new loan to Mantova.

International career
He was first called up to represent his country in 2015 for under-15 friendlies.

References

External links
 

2000 births
People from Sora, Lazio
Sportspeople from the Province of Frosinone
Footballers from Lazio
Living people
Italian footballers
Italy youth international footballers
Association football forwards
A.S. Roma players
FeralpiSalò players
S.P.A.L. players
Mantova 1911 players
Serie C players
Serie B players